Cuza Vodă is a commune in Galați County, Western Moldavia, Romania with a population of 2,580 people. It is composed of a single village, Cuza Vodă. This was part of Slobozia Conachi Commune until 2005, when it was split off to form a separate commune.

References

Communes in Galați County
Localities in Western Moldavia